Bradley Howell Ott (born December 29, 1969) is an American professional golfer who played on the Nationwide Tour.

Ott joined the Nationwide Tour in 1996. In his rookie season he recorded three top-10 finishes including a runner-up finish. He then took a hiatus from the Tour and rejoined in 2002. In his return to the Tour he recorded two top-10 finished and a runner-up finish. He picked up his first win on Tour in 2004 at the Price Cutter Charity Championship. He played on the Nationwide Tour until 2008, never reaching the PGA Tour.

Ott played on the Sunshine Tour in 1995 and 1996 and won the 1995 Hollard Royal Swazi Sun Classic. He has won tournaments on the Hooters Tour, Tight Lies Tour, Golden Bear Tour, Teardrop Tour, Ironman Tour, Mid-Atlantic Tour and Maverick Tour.

After Ott's touring career ended, he became a club professional. He earned entry into the 2016 PGA Championship through his finish at the PGA Professional National Championship. He is the director of instruction at TPC Craig Ranch and plays out of the Northern Texas section of the PGA.

Amateur wins (1)
???? Tri-State Amateur Championship

Professional wins (13)

Sunshine Tour wins (1)

Nationwide Tour wins (1)

Other wins (11)
1995 Southwest Kansas Pro-Am, 1 win on Hooters Tour
9 wins on the Tight Lies Tour, Hooters Tour, Teardrop Tour, Ironman Tour, Mid-Atlantic Tour, Maverick Tour, and Golden Bear Tour.

Results in major championships

CUT = missed the halfway cut
Note: Ott only played in the PGA Championship.

External links

American male golfers
Texas Tech Red Raiders men's golfers
PGA Tour golfers
Golfers from Dallas
1969 births
Living people